Country Class is the 32nd album by Jerry Lee Lewis, released on Mercury Records in 1976. Cam Mullins was credited for the string and horn arrangements on "Let's Put It Back Together", "Jerry Lee's Rock & Roll Revival Show" and "The Closest Thing to You".

Recording
Country Class produced one Top Ten hit, "Let's Put It Back Together Again," which made it to number 6 on the country singles chart. A portion of the album hearkens back to Jerry Lee's musical roots, with two Hank Williams covers and a moving rendition of the traditional "Old Country Church," but it mostly features ballads couched in the smooth production provided by long-time producer Jerry Kennedy. An often overlooked track is Jerry Lee's reading of Bob McDill's "Closest Thing To You," which only made it to number 27 but features a hauntingly restrained vocal from "the Killer."  The LP rose to number 16.

Graceland arrest
Country Class was released the same year that Lewis was arrested outside Elvis Presley's Graceland home for allegedly planning to shoot him. Lewis had already nearly killed his bass player Butch Owens on September 29 (his forty-first birthday) when a .357 accidentally went off in his hand. In Rick Bragg's 2014 authorized biography Jerry Lee Lewis: His Own Story, Lewis explains that the reclusive Presley had been trying to reach him and finally did on November 23, imploring that he "come out to the house."  Lewis replied that he would if he had time but that he was busy trying to get his father Elmo out of jail in Tunica for a DUI. Later that night, Lewis was at a Memphis nightclub called Vapors drinking champagne when he was given a gun. "Charles Feron, he owned Vapors, he give it to me," Lewis clarifies to Bragg. "A .38 derringer. Me, pretty well drunk, with that derringer - it ain't somethin' strange." Lewis suddenly remembered that Elvis wanted to see him and, climbing aboard his new Lincoln Continental with the loaded pistol on the dash and a bottle of champagne under his arm, tore off for Graceland. Just before three o'clock in the morning, Lewis accidentally smashed into the famous Graceland gates because the "nose of that Lincoln was a mile long."  Presley's astonished cousin Harold Lloyd was manning the gate and watched Lewis attempt to hurl the champagne bottle through the car window, not realizing it was rolled up, smashing both. Bragg reports that Lewis denies ever intending to do Presley harm, that the two were friends, but "Elvis, watching on the closed-circuit television, told guards to call the police. The Memphis police found the gun in the car and put Jerry Lee, protesting, hollering, threatening them, away in handcuffs."  Lewis: "The cops asked Elvis, 'What do you want us to do?  And Elvis told 'em, 'Lock him up.'  That hurt my feelings. To be scared of me - knowin' me the way he did - was ridiculous."  Lewis was charged with carrying a pistol and public drunkenness. Released on a $250 bond, his defiant mug shot was wired around the world. Presley would die at Graceland of a heart attack eight months later.

Track listing
"Let's Put It Back Together Again" (Jerry Foster, Bill Rice)
"No One Will Ever Know" (Mel Foree, Fred Rose)
"You Belong to Me" (Pee Wee King, Chilton Price, Redd Stewart)
"I Sure Miss Those Good Old Times" (Mack Vickery)
"Old Country Church" (Clarence Thorne, Lance Sterling)
"After the Fool You've Made of Me" (Jerry Foster, Bill Rice)
"Jerry Lee's Rock & Roll Revival Show" (Jerry Foster, Bill Rice)
"Wedding Bells" (Claude Boone)
"Only Love Can Get You in My Door" (Ric Marlow, Michel Rubini)
"The One Rose (That's Left in My Heart)" (Del Lyon, Lani McIntire)
"Closest Thing to You" (Bob McDill)

Jerry Lee Lewis albums
1976 albums
Albums produced by Jerry Kennedy
Mercury Records albums